Fiskadoro is post-apocalyptic novel by Denis Johnson published in 1985 by Alfred A. Knopf.

The story is set in the former state of Florida several decades after a global nuclear holocaust. An enclave of survivors, bereft of collective historical knowledge, attempt to reassemble human society and culture.

Plot

The story opens 60 years after a global nuclear holocaust. Only tiny enclaves of humans survive, one these in "Twicetown", in the region of the Florida Keys. Separate enclaves exist in the Everglades and at an Army compound, each with their own subcultures. The archives that could serve to reveal human history have been destroyed in the holocaust, and the surviving generations struggle to understand their origins. The 100-year-old Grandmother Wright is the only survivor whose life spans both pre- and post-apocalyptic periods. With the Christ-like adolescent boy, Fiskadoro, she attempts to discover the key to understanding the nature of human existence. Her grandson, Mr. Cheung, embarks on his own futile search for wisdom. Only Fiskadoro achieves an epiphany that leads him to genuine enlightenment.

Critical assessment

Eva Hoffman of The New York Times, confirming Fiskadoro'''s post-apocalyptic pedigree, writes:

Hoffman cautions: "[T]here is something in Fiskadoro that resists the reader's full submission, or suspension of disbelief."

Richard Eder of the Los Angeles Times offers fulsome praise for the novel: "...Johnson, author of the magical novel of a time after the nuclear holocaust—Fiskadoro—is remarkable and perfectly executed."

Michiko Kakutani, in her 1985 review of Fiskadoro writes:

Kakutani reprises her praise for the novel in 2017: "Plots in Mr. Johnson's books tend to be tangled, melodramatic affairs—often highly indebted to famous works by Conrad, Graham Greene and Robert Stone—in his lesser books...his writing can devolve into portentous philosophizing, larded with New Age and Nietzschean intonations...But in his masterworks—[among them] Fiskadoro...Johnson's incandescent language channels his characters' desperation."

Theme

Literary critic Eva Hoffman, identifying Fiskadoro'' as "parable of apocalypse" writes:

Literary critic Michiko Kakutani writes:

Footnotes

Sources 
 
 
 
 

1985 American novels
Alfred A. Knopf books
American post-apocalyptic novels
Cuba in fiction
Novels about music
Novels by Denis Johnson
Novels set in Florida